The Maryland Constitution of 1864 was the third of the four constitutions which have governed the U.S. state of Maryland.  A controversial product of the Civil War and in effect only until 1867, when the state's present constitution was adopted, the 1864 document was short-lived.

Drafting
The 1864 constitution was largely the product of strong Unionists, who had control of the state at the time. The document outlawed slavery, disenfranchised Southern sympathizers, and reapportioned the General Assembly based upon the number of white inhabitants. This provision further diminished the power of the small counties where the majority of the state's large former slave population lived. One of the framers' goals was to reduce the influence of Southern sympathizers, who had almost caused the state to secede in 1861.

Ratification
The convention which drafted the document convened on April 27, 1864 and completed their work by September 6.  The constitution was then submitted to the people for ratification on October 13, 1864. It was approved by a vote of 30,174 to 29,799 (50.31% to 49.69%). This was a very controversial result, since the state, though part of the Union, still had many Confederate ties and sympathies. The tally of those voting at their usual polling places was opposed to this Constitution by 29,536 to 27,541. However, the constitution secured ratification after the soldiers' votes were tallied. Soldiers from Maryland serving in the Union Army voted overwhelmingly in favor, 2,633 to 263.

Notable features
By design, the constitution disenfranchised those Marylanders who had left the state to fight for or live in the Confederacy or who had given it "any aid, comfort, countenace, or support." It also made it difficult for them to regain the full rights of citizenship and required office-holders to take a new oath of allegiance to support the state and union and to repudiate the rebellion.

Furthermore, the influence of the small counties which had large slave populations, and tended to have supported secession and to have opposed Union efforts during the war, was reduced by basing representation solely on white population. The constitution did emancipate the slaves, but this did not mean equality. The franchise was restricted to "white" males. Additionally, the Maryland legislature refused to ratify both the 14th Amendment, which conferred citizenship rights on former slaves, and the 15th Amendment, which gave the vote to African Americans.

Maryland's 1864 constitution created for the first time the position of Lieutenant Governor. The office was held by only one person, Christopher C. Cox, until a 1971 amendment to the 1867 constitution re-created the position.

References
Whitman H. Ridgway. Maryland Humanities Council (2001). "(Maryland) Politics and Law"
Whitman H. Ridgway. Maryland Humanities Council (2001). "(Maryland in) the Nineteenth Century".
Richard E. Berg-Andersson (Dec. 5, 2004). "Constitutions of the Several states".

External links
Article on the Maryland Constitution of 1864 by Ed Papenfuse

1864 in American law
Defunct state constitutions of the United States
Maryland law
History of slavery in Maryland
Maryland in the American Civil War
1864 in American politics
Legal history of Maryland
1864 in Maryland
1864 documents